János Beszteri-Balogh (born August 9, 1938) is a former Hungarian ice hockey player. He played for the Hungary men's national ice hockey team at the 1964 Winter Olympics in Innsbruck.

References

External links

1938 births
Living people
Ferencvárosi TC (ice hockey) players
Hungarian ice hockey forwards
Ice hockey players at the 1964 Winter Olympics
Olympic ice hockey players of Hungary
People from Heves
Sportspeople from Heves County